Elections in South Carolina are held to fill various local, state and federal seats. Special elections may be held to fill vacancies at other points in time. 

In a 2020 study, South Carolina was ranked as the 7th hardest state for citizens to vote in.

Recent elections

1996 elections
United States presidential election in South Carolina, 1996
United States Senate election in South Carolina, 1996
United States House of Representatives elections in South Carolina, 1996

1998 elections
United States Senate election in South Carolina, 1998
United States House of Representatives elections in South Carolina, 1998
South Carolina gubernatorial election, 1998

2000 elections
United States presidential election in South Carolina, 2000
United States House of Representatives elections in South Carolina, 2000

2002 elections
United States Senate election in South Carolina, 2002
United States House of Representatives elections in South Carolina, 2002
South Carolina gubernatorial election, 2002

2004 elections
United States presidential election in South Carolina, 2004
United States Senate election in South Carolina, 2004
United States House of Representatives elections in South Carolina, 2004

2006 elections
United States House of Representatives elections in South Carolina, 2006
South Carolina gubernatorial election, 2006
2006 state elections

2008 elections
 2008 South Carolina elections
 United States presidential election in South Carolina, 2008
 2008 Democratic primary 
 2008 Republican primary
 United States Senate election in South Carolina, 2008
 United States House of Representatives elections in South Carolina, 2008

2010 elections
 2010 South Carolina elections
United States House of Representatives elections in South Carolina, 2010
United States Senate election in South Carolina, 2010
South Carolina gubernatorial election, 2010

2012 elections
 2012 South Carolina elections
United States presidential election in South Carolina, 2012
 2012 Republican primary
United States House of Representatives elections in South Carolina, 2012

2014 elections
 2014 South Carolina elections
United States Senate election in South Carolina, 2014
United States House of Representatives elections in South Carolina, 2014
South Carolina gubernatorial election, 2014

2016 elections
United States presidential election in South Carolina, 2016
 2016 Democratic primary 
 2016 Republican primary
United States Senate election in South Carolina, 2016
United States House of Representatives elections in South Carolina, 2016

2017 elections
 2017 South Carolina's 5th congressional district special election

2018 elections
2018 South Carolina elections
United States House of Representatives elections in South Carolina, 2018
South Carolina gubernatorial election, 2018

2020 elections 
 2020 South Carolina elections
 2020 United States presidential election in South Carolina
 United States Senate election in South Carolina, 2020
 2020 United States House of Representatives elections in South Carolina

2022 elections 
 2022 South Carolina elections
 United States Senate election in South Carolina, 2022
 2022 South Carolina gubernatorial election
 2022 United States House of Representatives elections in South Carolina

Presidential elections through history

See also
Political party strength in South Carolina
South Carolina gubernatorial elections
United States presidential elections in South Carolina

References

External links
 
 

 
 
  (State affiliate of the U.S. League of Women Voters)
 

 
Elections
Political events in South Carolina